WOBL (1320 AM) – branded Gold Country 1320 AM & 107.7 FM – is a commercial classic country radio station licensed to Oberlin, Ohio, serving Lorain County and western parts of Greater Cleveland.  WOBL also simulcasts over low-power Oberlin translator W299CJ (107.7 FM). The WOBL studios are located in Oberlin, as are the transmitters for both WOBL and W299CJ.  In addition to a standard analog transmission, WOBL is available online.

History
WOBL began on December 24, 1971 at 1570 kHz as a daytime-only station with 250 watts of power.  The station soon moved to a full-time signal at 1320 kHz by September 1976, where it has remained to this day. Its country music format has been the longest running such format of any station in the region, even with a segue into "classic country" in early 2003.

WOBL has been a family operation throughout its entire history, founded by Harry Wilber, and run by Doug and Lorie Wilber until September 2021. WOBL Radio and its sister station is WDLW 1380AM in Lorain, which was acquired in late 2002 are now owned by Gary and Renee' Tollett. The Tollett's purchased both stations as of October 1, 2021, to continue the family tradition of family owned radio stations. Both stations respective studios are at the WOBL transmitter site in Oberlin, Ohio.

FM translator

Current programming
WOBL features a classic country format, dubbed as "Gold Country."

The station's airstaff currently includes Michelle Lee in the mornings from 7am - 11am with the Smoked Country Jam and "David Q" in the afternoons from 2pm - 6pm with the Afternoon Country Extravaganza. On Saturdays listen to "Big John" with the Showtime Saturday Show from 9am - 2pm and from 2pm-3pm listen to Carly Country with Carly Hoffman-Mitchell. Sunday afternoons catch Michelle Lee with Bluegrass Borderline. Newscasts are handled by Brian Engle (Program Director) with daily sports reports covered by Jim Allen.

WOBL broadcasts high school football and basketball and OHSAA radio broadcasts under direction from Sports Director Don Vincent.

WOBL is a local affiliate for Fox News Radio and ONN Radio.

References

External links

FCC History Cards for WOBL
FM translator

1971 establishments in Ohio
Country radio stations in the United States
Radio stations established in 1971
OBL